A razor strop or simply a strop (sometimes called a razor strap or strap) is a flexible strip of leather, canvas, denim fabric, balsa wood, or other soft material, used to straighten and polish the blade of a straight razor, a knife, or a woodworking tool such as a chisel. In many cases stropping re-aligns parts of the blade edge that have been bent out of alignment. In other cases, especially when abrasive polishing compound is used, stropping may remove a small amount of metal (functionally equivalent to lapping). Stropping can also burnish (i.e. push metal around on) the blade. 

The strop may be a hanging strop or a hand-held paddle. Various abrasive compounds may be applied to the strop to aid in polishing the blade while stropping to obtain a mirror-like finish. Common abrasive compounds include half-micron diamonds, green chromium(III) oxide, white rouge (aluminum oxide), and jeweller's rouge (iron(III) oxide).

Use 
Stropping is traditionally associated with straight razors used for shaving, as these are the thinnest blades in everyday use, and therefore require frequent stropping. Kitchen knives may be straightened on a honing steel if less sharpness is acceptable. In principle, any blade may be polished by stropping. Custom strops are made to hone irregularly-shaped tools, such as chisels or gouges, and nearly any piece of smooth leather or heavy fabric infused with abrasive compound may be used for stropping.

See also 
Knife sharpening
Honing steel
Lapping
Sharpening
Sharpening stone

References

External links
 Scienceofsharp, effects of various blade sharpening and stropping techniques, mostly on straight razors, shown by electron microscope.
 Electron microscope analysis of various sharpening techniques by John D. Verhoeven

Shaving
Grinding and lapping